North Essex was a parliamentary constituency represented in the House of Commons of the Parliament of the United Kingdom between 1997 and 2010. It elected one Member of Parliament (MP) by the first past the post system of election.

The name was also used for the Northern Division of Essex, electing two members from 1832 until 1868.

History
The Northern Division of Essex was one of two Divisions, along with the Southern Division, created from the undivided Parliamentary County of Essex by the Reform Act of 1832. The constituency was abolished under the Reform Act 1867 (as amended by the Boundaries Act 1868) which divided Essex into three two-member Divisions (East, South and West).

The North Essex constituency was created for the 1997 general election following the Fourth Periodic Review of parliamentary constituencies, mostly replacing the former seat of Colchester North.  This was abolished for the 2010 general election by the Fifth Review, when it was largely replaced by the new constituency of Harwich and North Essex.

Boundaries

1832–1868: The Hundreds of Clavering, Dunmow, Freshwell, Hinckford, Lexden, Tendring, Thurstable, Uttlesford, Winstree and Witham.

On abolition, the Hundreds of Hinckford, Lexden, Tendring, Thurstable, Winstree and Witham were included in the new East Division of Essex; the Hundreds of Clavering, Dunmow, Freshwell and Uttlesford were included in the new West Division.

1997–2010:
The Borough of Colchester wards of Birch Messing and Copford, Boxted and Langham, Dedham, East Donyland, Fordham, Great and Little Horkesley, Great Tey, Marks Tey, Pyefleet, Tiptree, West Bergholt and Eight Ash Green, West Mersea, Winstree, and Wivenhoe, and the District of Tendring wards of Alresford, Thorrington and Frating, Ardleigh, Bradfield, Wrabness and Wix, Brightlingsea East, Brightlingsea West, Elmstead, Great Bentley, Great Bromley, Little Bromley and Little Bentley, Lawford and Manningtree, Mistley, St Osyth, and Tendring and Weeley.

The new constituency comprised rural areas of the Borough of Colchester, including West Mersea and Wivenhoe, and western parts of the District of Tendring, including Brightlingsea.  Formed primarily from parts of the abolished County Constituencies of North Colchester and South Colchester and Maldon, with a small slice of the western part of the County Constituency of Harwich, including St Osyth.

The new Harwich and North Essex constituency 
On abolition in 2010, rural area to the south-west of Colchester were transferred to the new County Constituency of Witham.  The remainder formed the new County Constituency of Harwich and North Essex, together with the town of Harwich and surrounding areas, previously part of the abolished County Constituency of Harwich.

Members of Parliament

MPs 1832–1868

MPs 1997-2010

Elections

Elections in the 2000s

Elections in the 1990s

Elections in the 1860s

 Caused by Du Cane's appointment as a Civil Lord of the Admiralty.

Elections in the 1850s

 

 

 
 

 

 Caused by Beresford's appointment as Secretary at War.

Elections in the 1840s

Elections in the 1830s

 

 

 Caused by Baring's elevation to the peerage, becoming 1st Baron Ashburton

Boundary changes

See also 
 List of parliamentary constituencies in Essex

Notes and references

Parliamentary constituencies in Essex (historic)
Constituencies of the Parliament of the United Kingdom established in 1832
Constituencies of the Parliament of the United Kingdom disestablished in 1868
Constituencies of the Parliament of the United Kingdom established in 1997
Constituencies of the Parliament of the United Kingdom disestablished in 2010